To be energetic is to possess, exert, or display the ability to do physical work.

Energetic may also refer to:
 "Energetic" (BoA song), a 2010 song by BoA
 "Energetic" (Wanna One song), a 2017 song by Wanna One
 Energetic mood, a linguistic term

See also
 Energetics (disambiguation), relating to the study of energy under transformation
 Energized, a 1974 album by the group Foghat